The Beipan River Shuibai Railway Bridge was the world's highest railway bridge from 2001 to 2016. The bridge spans a deep canyon on the Beipan River near the city of Liupanshui in Guizhou province, China.  The arch bridge, with a maximum height of 275 metres and a span width of 236 metres, was built in 2001 with the construction of the Liupanshui–Baiguo railway. Here, the train runs on its highest speed.

See also
List of highest bridges in the world
List of longest arch bridge spans
Beipan River Guanxing Highway Bridge
Beipan River Hukun Expressway Bridge

External links
 Beipanjiang Railway Bridge Shuibai on HighestBridges.com

Bridges in Guizhou
Arch bridges in China
Railway bridges in China
Bridges completed in 2001
Bridges over the Beipan River